Medora is a city in Billings County, North Dakota, United States. The only incorporated place in Billings County, it is also the county seat. Much of the surrounding area is part of either Little Missouri National Grassland or Theodore Roosevelt National Park. The population was 121 at the 2020 census. It is part of the Dickinson Micropolitan Statistical Area.

History

Medora was founded in 1883 along the transcontinental rail line of the Northern Pacific Railway by French nobleman Marquis de Mores, who named the city after his wife Medora von Hoffman.  Marquis de Mores wanted to ship refrigerated meat to Chicago via the railroad. He built a meat packing plant for this purpose and a house named the Chateau de Mores, which is now a museum.

In the evening of April 7, 1903, President Theodore Roosevelt, who had visited and invested in ranches in the area in the 1880s, visited Medora on a presidential tour of the Western United States. Most of the Badlands' residents turned out to greet him on his whistle stop. Roosevelt later recalled that "the entire population of the Badlands down to the smallest baby had gathered to meet me… They all felt I was their man, their old friend; and even if they had been hostile to me in the old days when we were divided by the sinister bickering and jealousies and hatreds of all frontier communities, they now firmly believed they had always been my staunch friends and admirers. I shook hands with them all and…I only regretted that I could not spend three hours with them." A local hotel changed its name that same year to the Rough Riders Hotel. In 1986 the hotel was purchased and operated by the Theodore Roosevelt Medora Foundation.

Also home to the popular Medora Musical, the city of Medora has become one of the most popular tourist attractions in the state.

Geography
Medora is located at  (46.914258, -103.524942).

Climate
According to the Köppen climate classification system, Medora has a cold semi-arid climate (BSk).

Demographics

2010 census
As of the census of 2010, there were 112 people, 56 households, and 27 families living in the city. The racial makeup of the city was 93.8% White, 1.8% Native American, 3.6% Asian, and 0.9% from two or more races.

Of the 56 households 10.7% had children under the age of 18 living with them, 44.6% were married couples living together, 1.8% had a female householder with no husband present, 1.8% had a male householder with no wife present, and 51.8% were non-families. 46.4% of households were one person and 16.1% were one person aged 65 or older. The average household size was 1.84 and the average family size was 2.63.

The median age was 45.3 years. 11.6% of residents were under the age of 18; 10% were between the ages of 18 and 24; 27.8% were from 25 to 44; 32.1% were from 45 to 64; and 18.8% were 65 or older. The gender makeup of the city was 47.3% male and 52.7% female.

2000 census
As of the census of 2000, there were 100 people, 51 households, and 23 families living in the city. The population density was 271.7 people per square mile (104.4/km). There were 117 housing units at an average density of 317.9 per square mile (122.1/km). The racial makeup of the city was 100.00% White. Hispanic or Latino of any race were 1.00% of the population.

Of the 51 households 21.6% had children under the age of 18 living with them, 31.4% were married couples living together, 11.8% had a female householder with no husband present, and 54.9% were non-families. 51.0% of households were one person and 11.8% were one person aged 65 or older. The average household size was 1.96 and the average family size was 3.00.

The age distribution was 26.0% under the age of 18, 4.0% from 18 to 24, 29.0% from 25 to 44, 26.0% from 45 to 64, and 15.0% 65 or older. The median age was 41 years. For every 100 females, there were 96.1 males. For every 100 females age 18 and over, there were 94.7 males.

The median household income was $31,563 and the median family income  was $61,250. Males had a median income of $26,042 versus $21,094 for females. The per capita income for the city was $23,399. There were no families and 4.8% of the population living below the poverty line, including no under eighteens and 15.0% of those over 64.

Points of interest
 Medora Musical
 Theodore Roosevelt National Park (South Unit)
 Maah Daah Hey Trail
 Chateau de Mores

References

External links

 City of Medora official website
 Lodging Information
 TR's Early Days at TheodoreRoosevelt.com

Cities in Billings County, North Dakota
Cities in North Dakota
County seats in North Dakota
Populated places established in 1883
Dickinson, North Dakota micropolitan area
1883 establishments in Dakota Territory